The Book of Malachi (Hebrew:) is the last book of the Neviim contained in the Tanakh, canonically the last of the Twelve Minor Prophets. In the Christian ordering, the grouping of the prophetic books is the last section of the Old Testament, making Malachi the last book before the New Testament.

The book is commonly attributed to a prophet named Malachi, as its title has frequently been understood as a proper name, although its Hebrew meaning is simply "My Messenger" (the Septuagint reads "his messenger") and may not be the author's name at all. The name occurs in the superscription at 1:1 and in 3:1, although it is highly unlikely that the word refers to the same character in both of these references. Thus, there is substantial debate regarding the identity of the book's author. One of the Targums identifies Ezra (or Esdras) as the author of Malachi. Priest and Historian Jerome suggests that this may be because Ezra is seen as an intermediary between the prophets and the "great synagogue." There is, however, no historical evidence yet to support this claim.

Some scholars note affinities between Zechariah 9–14 and the Book of Malachi. Zechariah 9, Zechariah 12, and Malachi 1 are all introduced as The word of Elohim. Some scholars argue that this collection originally consisted of three independent and anonymous prophecies, two of which were subsequently appended to the Book of Zechariah as what they refer to as Deutero-Zechariah, with the third becoming the Book of Malachi. As a result, most scholars consider the Book of Malachi to be the work of a single author who may or may not have been identified by the title Malachi. The present division of the oracles results in a total of 12 books of minor prophets, a number parallelling the sons of Jacob who became the heads of the 12 Israelite tribes. The Catholic Encyclopedia asserts, "We are no doubt in presence of an abbreviation of the name Mál'akhîyah, that is Messenger of Elohim."

Author 
Little is known of the biography of the author of the Book of Malachi, although it has been suggested that he may have been Levitical. The books of Zechariah and Haggai were written during the lifetime of Ezra (see 5:1); perhaps this may explain the similarities in style.

According to the editors of the 1897 Easton's Bible Dictionary, some scholars believe the name "Malachi" is not a proper noun but rather an abbreviation of "messenger of Yah". This reading could be based on Malachi 3:1, "Behold, I will send my messenger...", if my messenger (מַלְאָכִ֔י mal’āḵî) is taken literally as the name Malachi.

Several scholars consider both Zechariah 9–14 and Malachi to be anonymous and were therefore placed at the end of the Book of the Twelve. Wellhausen, Abraham Kuenen, and Wilhelm Gustav Hermann Nowack argue that Malachi 1:1 is a late addition, pointing to Zechariah 9:1 and 12:1. However, other scholars, including the editors of the Catholic Encyclopedia, argue that the grammatical evidence leads us to conclude that Malachi is in fact a name.

Another interpretation of the authorship comes from the Septuagint superscription, ὲν χειρὶ ἀγγήλου αὐτοῦ (en cheiri angēlou autou, which can be read as either "by the hand of his messenger" or as "by the hand of his angel". The "angel" reading found an echo among the ancient Church Fathers and ecclesiastical writers, and even gave rise to the "strangest fancies", especially among the disciples of Origen of Alexandria.

Period 

There are very few historical details in the Book of Malachi. The greatest clue as to its dating may lie in the fact that the Persian-era term for governor ( pehâ) is used in 1:8. This points to a post-exilic (that is, after 538 BC) date of composition both because of the use of the Persian period term and because Judah had a king before the exile. Since, in the same verse, the temple has been rebuilt, the book must also be later than 515 BC. Malachi was apparently known to the author of Ecclesiasticus early in the 2nd century BC. Because of the development of themes in the book of Malachi, most scholars assign it to a position after Haggai and Zechariah, close to the time when Ezra and Nehemiah came to Jerusalem in 445 BC.

Aim 

The Book of Malachi was written to correct the lax religious and social behaviour of the Israelites – particularly the priests – in post-exilic Jerusalem. Although the prophets urged the people of Judah and Israel to see their exile as punishment for failing to uphold their covenant with God, it was not long after they had been restored to the land and to Temple worship that the people's commitment to their God began, once again, to wane. It was in this context that the prophet commonly referred to as Malachi delivered his prophecy.

In 1:2, Malachi has the people of Israel question God's love for them. This introduction to the book illustrates the severity of the situation which Malachi addresses. The graveness of the situation is also indicated by the dialectical style with which Malachi confronts his audience. Malachi proceeds to accuse his audience of failing to respect God as God deserves. One way in which this disrespect is made manifest is through the substandard sacrifices which Malachi claims are being offered by the priests. While God demands animals that are "without blemish" (Leviticus 1:3, NRSV), the priests, who were "to determine whether the animal was acceptable" (Mason 143), were offering blind, lame and sick animals for sacrifice because they thought nobody would notice.

In 2:1, Malachi states Yahweh Sabaoth is sending a curse on the priests who have not honored him with appropriate animal sacrifices: "Now, watch how I am going to paralyze your arm and throw dung in your face--the dung from your very solemnities--and sweep you away with it. Then you shall learn that it is I who have given you this warning of my intention to abolish my covenant with Levi, says Yahweh Sabaoth."

In 2:10, Malachi addresses the issue of divorce. On this topic, Malachi deals with divorce both as a social problem ("Why then are we faithless to one another ... ?" 2:10) and as a religious problem ("Judah ... has married the daughter of a foreign god" 2:11). In contrast to the book of Ezra, Malachi urges each to remain steadfast to the wife of his youth.

Malachi also criticizes his audience for questioning God's justice. He reminds them that God is just, exhorting them to be faithful as they await that justice. Malachi quickly goes on to point out that the people have not been faithful. In fact, the people are not giving God all that God deserves. Just as the priests have been offering unacceptable sacrifices, so the people have been neglecting to offer their full tithe to God. The result of these shortcomings is that the people come to believe that no good comes out of serving God.

Malachi assures the faithful among his audience that in the eschaton, the differences between those who served God faithfully and those who did not will become clear. The book concludes by calling upon the teachings of Moses and by promising that Elijah will return prior to the Day of Yahweh.

Interpretations 

The book of Malachi is divided into three chapters in the Hebrew Bible and the Greek Septuagint and four chapters in the Latin Vulgate. The fourth chapter in the Vulgate consists of the remainder of the third chapter starting at verse 3:19.

Christianity
The New Revised Standard Version of the Bible supplies headings for the book as follows:

The majority of scholars consider the book to be made up of six distinct oracles. According to this scheme, the book of Malachi consists of a series of disputes between Yahweh and the various groups within the Israelite community. In the course of the book's three or four chapters, Yahweh is vindicated while those who do not adhere to the law of Moses are condemned. Some scholars have suggested that the book, as a whole, is structured along the lines of a judicial trial, a suzerain treaty or a covenant—one of the major themes throughout the Hebrew Scriptures. Implicit in the prophet's condemnation of Israel's religious practices is a call to keep Yahweh's statutes.

The Book of Malachi draws upon various themes found in other books of the Bible. Malachi appeals to the rivalry between Jacob and Esau and of Yahweh's preference for Jacob contained in Book of Genesis 25–28. Malachi reminds his audience that, as descendants of Jacob (Israel), they have been and continue to be favoured by God as God's chosen people. In the second dispute, Malachi draws upon the Levitical Code (e.g. Leviticus 1:3) in condemning the priest for offering unacceptable sacrifices.

In the third dispute (concerning divorce), the author of the Book of Malachi likely intends his argument to be understood on two levels. Malachi appears to be attacking either the practice of divorcing Jewish wives in favour of foreign ones (a practice which Ezra vehemently condemns) or, alternatively, Malachi could be condemning the practice of divorcing foreign wives in favour of Jewish wives (a practice which Ezra promoted). Malachi appears adamant that nationality is not a valid reason to terminate a marriage, "For I hate divorce, says the Lord . . ." (2:16).

In many places throughout the Hebrew Scriptures – particularly the Book of Hosea – Israel is figured as Yahweh's wife or bride. Malachi's discussion of divorce may also be understood to conform to this metaphor. Malachi could very well be urging his audience not to break faith with Yahweh (the God of Israel) by adopting new gods or idols. It is quite likely that, since the people of Judah were questioning Yahweh's love and justice (1:2, 2:17), they might be tempted to adopt foreign gods. William LaSor suggests that, because the restoration to the land of Judah had not resulted in anything like the prophesied splendor of the messianic age which had been prophesied, the people were becoming quite disillusioned with their religion.

Indeed, the fourth dispute asserts that judgment is coming in the form of a messenger who "is like refiner's fire and like fullers' soap . . ." (3:2).

Following this, the prophet provides another example of wrongdoing in the fifth dispute – that is, failing to offer full tithes. In this discussion, Malachi has Yahweh request the people to "Bring the full tithe . . . [and] see if I will not open the windows of heaven for you and pour down on you an overflowing blessing" (3:10). This request offers the opportunity for the people to amend their ways. It also stresses that keeping the Lord's statutes will not only allow the people to avoid God's wrath, but will also lead to God's blessing.  (It is this portion of Malachi which is used as support for the view that tithing is required of Christians.)

In the sixth dispute, the people of Israel illustrate the extent of their disillusionment. Malachi has them say "'It is vain to serve God . . . Now we count the arrogant happy; evildoers not only prosper, but when they put God to the test they escape'" (3:14–15). Once again, Malachi has Yahweh assure the people that the wicked will be punished and the faithful will be rewarded.

In the light of what Malachi understands to be an imminent judgment, he exhorts his audience to "Remember the teaching of my servant Moses, that statutes and ordinances that I commanded him at Horeb for all Israel" (4:4; 3:22, MT). Before the Day of the Lord, Malachi declares that Elijah (who "ascended in a whirlwind into heaven . . . [,]" 2 Kings 2:11) will return to earth in order that people might follow in God's ways.

Primarily because of its messianic promise, the Book of Malachi is frequently referred to in the Christian New Testament. What follows is a brief comparison between the Book of Malachi and the New Testament texts which refer to it (as suggested in Hill 84–88).

Although many Christians believe that the messianic prophecies of the Book of Malachi have been fulfilled in the life, ministry, transfiguration, death and resurrection of Jesus of Nazareth, most Jews continue to await the coming of the prophet Elijah who will prepare the way for the Lord.

References

External links 

 New American Bible
 21st Century KJV
 NIRV
 Malachi at Chabad.org
  Various versions

Bibliography
 Hill, Andrew E. Malachi: A New Translation with Introduction and Commentary. The Anchor Bible Volume 25D. Toronto: Doubleday, 1998.
 LaSor, William Sanford et al. Old Testament Survey: the Message, Form, and Background of the Old Testament. Grand Rapids: William B. Eerdmans, 1996.
 Mason, Rex. The Books of Haggai, Zechariah and Malachi. The Cambridge Bible Commentary on the New English Bible. New York, Cambridge University Press, 1977.
 Singer, Isidore & Adolf Guttmacher. "Book of Malachi." JewishEncyclopedia.com. 2002.
 Van Hoonacker, A. "Malachias (Malachi)." Catholic Encyclopedia. Transcribed by Thomas J. Bress. 2003.

 
6th-century BC books
5th-century BC books
Twelve Minor Prophets